Vorukh (Russian and Tajik: Ворух) is a jamoat in northern Tajikistan. It is an exclave surrounded by Kyrgyzstan that forms part of the city of Isfara in Sughd Region. , the jamoat had a total population of 30,506.

History and territorial conflicts

Vorukh is the name of a village and one of two exclaves of Tajikistan within the Batken Province of Kyrgyzstan. There are three Tajik enclaves (including the Sarvan exclave surrounded by Uzbekistan), which were products of several border adjustments during the Stalin regime of the 1920s to 1950s.

Due to the inherent territorial restrictions of the exclave, violent conflicts over land ownership, access to pasture, and shared water resources have become more common, as logistical complications within this densely populated and impoverished region have also given rise to economic concern.

The location of the border of the enclave is disputed by the Tajik and Kyrgyz governments. In April 2013 an argument between Vorukh residents and Kyrgyz labourers escalated into a fight, ultimately involving several hundred people, when Vorukh residents objected to the building of a new road that would bypass the enclave. In May 2013 Kyrgyzstan and Tajik officials met to address the ongoing tensions. In April and May 2021 the region once again brought tensions between the two countries - at least 31 people were killed in an ongoing fighting. Brief clashes also occurred in January 2022.

Climate
Köppen-Geiger climate classification system classifies its climate as dry-summer continental (Dsa).

References

See also
List of enclaves and exclaves
Kayragach, the other Tajikistan exclave in Kyrgyzstan
Sarvan, a Tajikistan exclave in Uzbekistan
Shohimardon, an Uzbekistan exclave in Kyrgyzstan
Sokh, an Uzbekistan exclave in Kyrgyzstan

Populated places in Sughd Region
Jamoats of Tajikistan
Enclaves and exclaves